Kang District is a district of Nimruz Province in Afghanistan. It has a population of about 13,514 , which is 60% ethnic Pashtun, 25% Baloch, and 15% Tajik.

See also
Districts of Afghanistan

References

Districts of Nimruz Province